Grounds is the plural of ground

Grounds may also refer to:

 Coffee grounds, granulated remains of coffee beans after grinding for coffee
 Grounds, in law, a rational motive or basis for a belief, conviction, or action taken, such as a legal action or argument:
 Grounds for divorce

People
 Bertie Grounds (1878–1950), Australian cricketer
 Jonathan Grounds (born 1988), English footballer 
 Sir Roy Grounds (1905–1981), Australian architect
 Arthur Grounds (1898–1951), Australian politician
 Joan Grounds (1939 – 2010), American-born Australian artist
 Lucy Grounds (1908–1987), Australian politician
 Vernon Grounds (1914–2010), American theologian and evangelical 
 William Grounds (1874–1958), New Zealand politician 
 Tony Grounds (born 1957), British television scriptwriter
 Housie Grounds (1903–1963), Australian rules footballer

See also
 Groundskeeping, tending an area of land for aesthetic or functional purposes
 Greenskeeper, a person responsible for the care and upkeep of a golf course